Nicolas Reyes (born 22 November 1958) is the lead singer, guitarist, songwriter, arranger, producer and founder of the French musical group Gipsy Kings, along with Tonino Baliardo, the group popular for their Spanish music in the 1980s. Even though the group members were born in France, he was brought up in a Spanish culture since their parents were gitanos who fled Catalonia during the Spanish Civil War.

He sings in different styles which mainly include traditional and popular flamenco and Latin American rumba music. With his hoarse and passionate voice, he is one of the most prominent flamenco singers in the world. Along with the Gipsy Kings, Nicolas Reyes sang songs such as "Bamboleo", "Volare", "Djobi Djoba", "Hotel California" and many others topping the charts, which he played the rhythm guitar and palmas (hand clapping). He is left-handed.

He is the son of the flamenco singer José Reyes, and the cousin of Manitas de Plata, Hyppolyte Baliardo, and the three Bilardo brothers: Diego, Paco and Tonino. Nicolas is the third of José Reyes' five sons, his older brothers are Pablo and Canut Reyes and the youngest are Patchaï and André, who all are active members of the group. Nicolas continues to sing for the group, although Canut and Patchaï also appear as main vocals. Georges, the son of Nicolas, who was born in 1975, also tours with the group.

Nicolas Reyes speaks Spanish, Catalan and French. He lives in Arles, in the south of France near the other members of the Gipsy Kings and their relatives who live between Arles and Montpellier.

See also
New Flamenco
Flamenco rumba
Gipsy Kings

References

External links 
 
 

Flamenco guitarists
Gipsy Kings members
Living people
Year of birth missing (living people)
Romani guitarists
French Romani people
French male singer-songwriters
Flamenco singers
Rumba singers
People from Arles
1958 births
Romani singers